Nathan Trist (born 22 December 1982 in Kiama, Australia) is a rugby union footballer. He plays for the Waratahs in Super Rugby. His regular playing position is outside back.

He made his senior debut during the 2012 Super Rugby season against the Rebels.

Reference List 
 https://web.archive.org/web/20120406120117/http://www.nswrugby.com.au/NSWRugby/News/NewsArticle/tabid/374/ArticleID/4621/Default.aspx
 http://www.smh.com.au/rugby-union/union-news/togs-slog-tahs-stars-brief-rundown-for-charity-20111208-1okrr.html

External links 
 Waratahs player profile
 itsrugby.co.uk profile

Rugby union fullbacks
Living people
Australian rugby union players
1982 births
New South Wales Waratahs players
Rugby union players from New South Wales